In the AFL Women's (AFLW), the Geelong best and fairest award is awarded to the best and fairest player at the Geelong Football Club during the home-and-away season. The award has been awarded annually since the club's inaugural season in the competition in 2019, with Meg McDonald the inaugural winner of the award.

Recipients

See also

 Carji Greeves Medal (list of Geelong Football Club best and fairest winners in the Australian Football League)

References

AFL Women's awards
Lists of AFL Women's players
AFLW
Awards established in 2019
!